Peković is a Serbian surname. It may refer to:

Branko Peković (born 1979), water polo player
Dejan Peković (born 1973), footballer
Miladin Peković (born 1983), basketball player
Milorad Peković (born 1977), footballer
Mitar Peković (born 1981), footballer
Nikola Peković (born 1986), basketball player
Radoslav Peković (born 1994), basketball player

Serbian surnames